Sarah Conrad (born March 9, 1985 in Halifax, Nova Scotia) is a Canadian snowboarder, specializing in the halfpipe.

Conrad made her World Cup debut in December 2002 at Whistler, British Columbia. She made her first World Cup podium at Stoneham, Canada in March 2008, where she won silver. To date, she has won one other medal, a bronze in March 2009.

Conrad has also competed in two FIS Snowboarding World Championships, with her best performance coming in 2009, when she finished 12th.

Conrad competed at the 2006 Winter Olympics, in the halfpipe. She finished 20th in the first qualifying round and 9th in the second, not enough to qualify for the final.

Conrad was also selected as a member of the Canadian team for the 2010 Winter Olympics.

World Cup podiums

References

External links
FIS profile
Official site

1985 births
Canadian female snowboarders
Living people
Olympic snowboarders of Canada
Snowboarders at the 2006 Winter Olympics
Snowboarders at the 2010 Winter Olympics
Sportspeople from Halifax, Nova Scotia